Simone "Simca" Beck (7 July 1904 – 20 December 1991) was a French cookbook writer and cooking teacher who, along with colleagues Julia Child and Louisette Bertholle, played a significant role in the introduction of French cooking technique and recipes into American kitchens.

Early life
She was born on 7 July 1904, in Tocqueville-en-Caux, near Dieppe in Normandy. Her family was rich because they had a business in production of Benedictine liqueur. When she was little, she liked helping her family cook to prepare desserts or entire meals. She spent some years learning bookbinding and being a sales representative, where she met her second husband, but subsequently Beck's career was devoted to food. In 1933, at the end of her marriage with Jacques Jarlaud, she applied to the Le Cordon Bleu school in Paris. In 1937 she married Jean Victor Fischbacher, keeping her maiden name as a pen name and professionally, but using her husband's name socially.

Cooking career
The start of Beck's professional career as a cook and teacher was after World War II, and after joining Le Cercle des Gourmettes, an exclusive women's culinary club. She became involved in the world of cooking. She was inspired to write a cookbook for Americans by Louisette Bertholle and her husband.

The first attempt at writing a cookbook wasn't successful, so Beck and Bertholle published the brief What's Cooking in France? in 1952. After that Beck published a booklet Le pruneau devant le fourneau: Recettes de cuisine (ca. 1952), Beck's only publication in French. In 1949, after she had met Julia Child, she became inspired to write a French cookbook for Americans again. She, Child, and Bertholle together wrote Mastering the Art of French Cooking, which was published in 1961. Mastering the Art of French Cooking, Vol. II (without Louisette Bertholle) followed in 1970, elaborating on several subjects (particularly baking and charcuterie) that the authors felt had received insufficient coverage in the first volume.

Both Bertholle and Child became members of Le Cercle des Gourmettes. After three years, the three women formed l'École des trois gourmandes to give lessons in French cooking to American women who lived in Paris. This school had been working up to the late 1970s. While Child became a successful television chef in the United States, Beck continued her teaching practice at home. In 1972 she published her own cookbook, Simca's Cuisine (with Patricia Simon), using some of the recipes that had not been mentioned in her previous books with Child and Bertholle. In 1979, she published the second volume, New Menus from Simca's Cuisine, with Michael James, who was her student, friend, and assistant since the 1970s. Food and Friends: Recipes and Memories from Simca's Cuisine, her autobiography and last cookbook (with Suzy Patterson), was published in 1991, the year she died.

Death
Simone Beck died on Friday, December 20, 1991, at her home in Châteauneuf-de-Grasse, a small village near Nice. She was 87.  
Her cousin, Harold Earle said she had been having heart problems for several months and had stopped eating, he added, "The doctor said that because she wouldn't eat, she died".

In popular culture 

 She was portrayed by American actress Linda Emond in the 2009 film Julie & Julia.
 She was portrayed by Isabella Rossellini in the 2022 comedy television series Julia.

Bibliography
What's Cooking in France (Ives Washburn, Inc., 1952)
Le pruneau devant le fourneau: Recettes de cuisine (Louis Moulinié, 1957)
Mastering the Art of French Cooking Volume 1 co-authored with Julia Child and Louisette Bertholle 1961
Mastering the Art of French Cooking Volume 2 co-authored with Julia Child) 1970
Simca's Cuisine: 100 Classic French Recipes for Every Occasion co-authored with Patricia Simon 1972
New Menus from Simca's Cuisine co-authored with Michael James 1979
Food and Friends: Recipes and Memories from Simca's Cuisine co-authored with Suzanne Patterson 1991

References

External links
Simone Beck Papers.
Schlesinger Library, Radcliffe Institute, Harvard University.

1904 births
1991 deaths
French chefs
Women cookbook writers
Alumni of Le Cordon Bleu
20th-century French women writers
20th-century French non-fiction writers
James Beard Foundation Award winners